Anupama Raag is a Bollywood music director and singer, born in Lucknow and educated at Bhatkhande Music Institute.

Biography

Education 
Annupama Raag was trained in classical music at Ustad Gulshan Bharti of Lucknow gharana, and Yogendra Bhat of Gwalior gharana, under the traditional guru-shishya parampara.

Early career 
She made her Bollywood debut in 2011 with the number "Shalu ke thumke", in the movie Bin Bulaye Barati. The song was composed by Anand Raj. In the same year she sang "Nazar Se Nazar Mile" together with Rahat Fateh Ali Khan, in Mile Na Mile Ham. She has sung with Mika Singh in the movie Zila Ghaziabad and with Madhuri Dixit in Gulab Gang.

Later career 
Raag has produced music for films and albums. She works for Salman Khan productions and Yash Raj Films, and has also composed music for Lucknow Development Authority and the Uttar Pradesh Pride Song for Uttar Pradesh Government. She has also composed jingles for TV Commercials for various brands.

Her album with Mika Singh was called Laal Dupatta. On 21 January 2017, the song "Saware" with Rahat Fateh Ali Khan was released.

Awards and titles 
She received the "Yash Bharati" Award by Uttar Pradesh government for 2016—2017.

Filmography

Singer

Music Director

References

Living people
Indian women classical singers
Singers from Lucknow
Year of birth missing (living people)
Women musicians from Uttar Pradesh
21st-century Indian women singers
21st-century Indian singers